Shirley Kelly is a former Australian international lawn bowler.

Bowls career
Kelly was selected as part of the five woman team by Australia for the 1981 World Outdoor Bowls Championship, which was held in Toronto, Canada.

She won a triples gold medal (with Pat Smith and Norma Massey) and a fours silver medal, at the 1985 Asia Pacific Bowls Championships, held in Tweed Heads, Australia.

References

Australian female bowls players
Living people
Year of birth missing (living people)
20th-century Australian women